Pomarea is a genus of birds in the monarch flycatcher family Monarchidae. The genus is restricted to the islands of Polynesia. The monarchs of this genus are around 15–19 cm long and most have sexually dimorphic plumage.

Taxonomy and systematics

Extant species
The genus Pomarea contains six extant species, including one possible extinct:
 Rarotonga monarch (Pomarea dimidiata)
 Tahiti monarch (Pomarea nigra)
 Marquesan monarch (Pomarea mendozae)
 Ua Pou monarch (Pomarea mira) (Possibly extinct)
 Iphis monarch (Pomarea iphis)
 Fatu Hiva monarch (Pomarea whitneyi)

Extinct species
 †Maupiti monarch (Pomarea maupitiensis)
 †Nuku Hiva monarch (Pomarea nukuhivae)
 †Eiao monarch (Pomarea fluxa)

Former species
Formerly, some authorities also considered the following species (or subspecies) as species within the genus Pomarea:
Bougainville monarch (as Pomarea erythrosticta)
Chestnut-bellied monarch (ugiensis) (as Pomarea ugiensis)

Status
The genus is highly threatened, with three of the six remaining species listed as critically endangered, one endangered and two vulnerable. Three species have already become extinct. The principal threat to all these species is predation by the introduced black rat.

References

 
Bird genera
 
Taxa named by Charles Lucien Bonaparte
Taxonomy articles created by Polbot